Susan Stone (born 31 January 1950), previously Susan Eager, is a Canadian former professional tennis player.

Born in Vancouver, British Columbia, Stone was active on the international circuit in the 1970s. While competing on the WTA Tour she played in the quarter-finals of the 1973 Canadiana Open, losing to Martina Navratilova. She represented the Canada Federation Cup team in 1975 and 1976, for World Group ties against Japan and Switzerland.

See also
List of Canada Fed Cup team representatives

References

External links
 
 
 

1950 births
Living people
Canadian female tennis players
Racket sportspeople from British Columbia
Sportspeople from Vancouver